The Angelmakers is a 2005 documentary, the debut film of filmmaker Astrid Bussink, which provides insight into the epidemic of arsenic murders by women, known as The Angel Makers of Nagyrév, which brought worldwide attention to the area in 1929. The documentary won the First Appearance competition at the International Documentary Film Festival Amsterdam, as well as several other awards.

The film is shot on location in the rural Hungarian village of Nagyrév, alternating between portraits of the surrounding landscape and first-hand narrations by the elderly inhabitants.

Some women poisoned unwanted husbands based on their oppression, drunkenness or laziness, some because the wives had taken lovers, some because the husbands had returned home disabled from World War I.  Unwanted babies were also poisoned.
A web of stories unfolds through the characters' memories which recapture old but ever-lasting tales of life, death and the struggle between the two sexes. One of them is the midwife's story as well as one of the narrators' revelation that the 'flypaper' murders were a widespread practice not only in the particular area but on a national level. The film tries to give some insight in the domestic battles that the women of the village have to fight.

References

External links
 
 Documentary web site
 The Angelmakers (review from muse.jhu.edu)
 Article on the murders
 Another article on the murders (in Hungarian)
 TWO NAGYREV BABIES POISONED BY ARSENIC; Exhumation Gives New Turn to Series of Murders in Hungarian District The New York Times, 1929-09-13
 Hungary Opens Grim Trials of Fifty Women For Poisoning Husbands and Other Relatives The New York Times, 1929-12-14
 MURDER BY WHOLESALE: A TALE FROM HUNGARY; HUNGARY'S BORGIAS AT THE BARThe New York Times, 1930-03-16

2005 films
Dutch documentary films
2000s Dutch-language films
Documentary films about crime
Documentary films about Hungary
2005 documentary films
2005 directorial debut films